Javolution is a real-time library aiming to make Java or Java-Like/C++  applications faster and more time predictable. Indeed, time-predictability can easily be ruined by the use of the standard library (lazy 
initialization, array resizing, etc.) which is not acceptable for safety-critical systems. The open source Javolution library addresses these concerns for the Java platform and native applications. It provides numerous high-performance classes and utilities useful to non real-time applications as well. Such as:

 Collections classes, supporting custom views, closure-based iterations, map-reduce paradigm, parallel computing, etc.
 Worst-case execution time behavior documented using Realtime Java annotations
 Fractal structures to maintain high-performance regardless of the size of the data
 OSGi contexts allowing cross cutting concerns (concurrency, logging, security, ...) to be addressed at run-time through OSGi published services without polluting the application code (separation of concerns)
 Algorithmic parallel computing support with concurrent contexts and general-purpose computing on graphics processing units with compute context
 Struct/Union base classes for direct interfacing with native applications
 Perfometer utility class to measure worst-case execution time with high precision 
 XML Marshalling/unmarshalling facility capable of direct serialization/deserialization of existing classes (no intermediate data structure required)
 StAX-like XML reader/writer which does not require object creation (such as String) and consequently faster than standard StAX
 Simple yet powerful configuration management for your application.

Since version 6.0, Javolution makes it easy to port any Java source code to C++ for cross-platform native compilation. OSGi and JUnit have been ported and are included with the core C++ distribution.

All modules (Java and native) are built using maven. Javolution can be used either as an OSGi bundle (preferred) or as a standalone library.

References

External links 
 Javolution website
 Fully Time Deterministic Java – AIAA Space 2007 Conference
 Validating Java for Safety-Critical Applications – AIAA Space 2005 Conference
 Turbo-Charging Java for Real-Time Applications – Java Developer Journal Article

Java APIs